The Count of Monte Cristo is a 1956 British cult swashbuckler adventure television series produced by ITC Entertainment/TPA and adapted very loosely from the 1844 novel by Alexandre Dumas by Sidney Marshall. It premiered in the UK in early 1956 and ran for 39 thirty-minute episodes dramatizing the continuing adventures of Edmond Dantès, the self-styled Count of Monte Cristo, during the reign of Louis Philippe I d'Orléans, King of the French from 1830 to 1848.  The first twelve episodes were filmed in the United States, at the Hal Roach studios, with the rest being filmed at ITC's traditional home of Elstree.

ITC produced a film based on the same source-material, The Count of Monte-Cristo, in 1975.

Cast
 George Dolenz as the title character
 Fortunio Bonanova
 Robert Cawdron
 Nick Cravat

Guest stars who would go on to later fame included Patrick Troughton, Stratford Johns, Cyril Shaps, Anthony Newlands, John Barrard, Raf De La Torre and Nigel Davenport.

Episodes
 "A Toy for the Infanta"
 "Marseilles"
 "The Luxembourg Affair"
 "The Texas Affair"
 "The Mazzini Affair"
 "The Carbonari"
 "The Devil's Emissary"
 "Bordeaux"
 "Flight to Calais"
 "Albania"
 "Naples"
 "The Art of Terror"
 "The Experiment"
 "Mecklenburg"
 "The Portuguese Affair"
 "Lichtenburg"
 "Burgundy"
 "Majorca"
 "Sicily"
 "A Matter of Justice"
 "Athens"
 "The Talleyrand Affair"
 "The Island"
 "The Barefoot Empress"
 "The Brothers"
 "Monaco"
 "Point, Counter Point"
 "The Black Death"
 "Victor Hugo"
 "Return to the Chateau D'if"
 "The Pen and the Sword"
 "The Sardinian Affair"
 "The Affair of the Three Napoleons"
 "The Deberry Affair"
 "The First Train to Paris"
 "The Golden Blade"
 "The Duel"
 "Andorra"
 "An Affair of Honour"

Home media
A 5-disc DVD set containing all thirty-nine re-mastered and uncut, original episodes was released by Network Distributing Ltd Home Entertainment/Granada Ventures Ltd on 12 April 2010 (currently only in Region 2 PAL format; not yet available in the United States).

References

External links
 

1950s British drama television series
1956 British television series debuts
1956 British television series endings
British adventure television series
Black-and-white British television shows
British drama television series
English-language television shows
ITV television dramas
Television shows based on The Count of Monte Cristo
Television series by ITC Entertainment
Television series set in the 1810s
Television series set in the 1820s
Television series set in the 1830s
Television shows shot at British National Studios